The 1897 Penn Quakers football team represented the University of Pennsylvania in the 1897 college football season. The team finished with a 15–0 record and was retroactively named as the national champion by the Billingsley Report, Helms Athletic Foundation, Houlgate System, and National Championship Foundation, and as a co-national champion by Parke H. Davis. They outscored their opponents 463 to 20.

Legacy
Head coach George Washington Woodruff and players Truxtun Hare, John Minds, and John H. Outland are all inductees of the College Football Hall of Fame. Outland is the namesake of the Outland Trophy, awarded annually to the best college football interior lineman. The Quakers' 15 wins in a single season would not be equalled until the 2018 Clemson Tigers.

Schedule

References

Further reading
 

Penn
Penn Quakers football seasons
College football national champions
College football undefeated seasons
Penn Quakers football